Ronnie Woo (born March 1, 1985) is an American chef, television personality, author, and former model. He hosted a cooking reality show, Food To Get You Laid, where he coached people in their homes to prepare meals using ingredients they already had, and is a regular guest on The Rachael Ray Show and The Today Show.

Personal life 
Woo grew up in Seattle, Washington with his parents and two sisters. At the age of 19, he moved to Los Angeles, California, to pursue his modeling career. He currently resides in Los Angeles, California.

Modeling 
Woo was signed to Wilhelmina Models when he was 19 years old shortly after moving to Los Angeles, but eventually switched to Ford Models a few years later. He did both print and runway modeling. Some of his past modeling work includes Nordstrom, Macy's, K-Swiss, Rayban, and Banana Republic.

Education 
Woo attended the University of Washington from 2003 to 2004, but moved to Los Angeles after his first year. After taking a year off from school, he transferred to the University of California, Los Angeles in 2006 and graduated in 2009 with an undergraduate degree in psychology and later received two master's degrees: a Masters in Marriage and Family Therapy and a Masters in Business Administration. Although Woo did not continue on to be a therapist, he does support the profession and "believes that everyone should have one.".

Chef and TV career

The Delicious Cook 
In 2011, Woo completed a culinary program with the Northwest Culinary Academy of Vancouver while also creating his food blog, The Delicious Cook. A few months later, his food blog evolved into what is now his private chef company, based in Beverly Hills, which specializes in intimate four-star dinner parties. Woo has worked with Mindy Kaling, Gwyneth Paltrow, Jessica Alba, Charlie Sheen, Kathy Griffin, Holly Robinson Peete, Dita Von Teese, Nancy O'Dell, and Gilles Marini. On May 5, 2013, Woo premiered a pop-up event called Salt & Honey, which served California comfort-style dishes.

Food To Get You Laid 
Woo is the host and chef of the cooking and reality television show Food To Get You Laid on Logo TV. The show was originally set to premiere on August 16, 2015, but was later changed to an earlier premiere date, August 14, 2015. In the show, Woo coaches real people in their homes on how to cook a meal in their kitchen in hopes to spice up their love life via recipes that everyday people can make at home.

Woo said this about the show: “Food does more than just bring people together, it creates memories. I think all of us have the tools to create a memorable meal, so we’re going into people’s homes and showing them how they can use what’s already in their kitchen to make a romantic and delicious meal they'll never forget."

Television and guest appearances 
Woo was a guest chef expert on Season 4 of Home Made Simple on the Oprah Winfrey Network (OWN) and was added to the cast as a regular chef expert in season 5. He has made guest appearances on Tyra Banks's FABLife (where Chrissy Teigen asked him to cook shirtless), Fuse's Big Freedia: Queen of Bounce, and is a regular contributor to Good Day LA. Woo has also made a celebrity chef appearance on NBC's Food Fighters. In 2016, Woo joined the cast of Logo TV's Secret Guide To Summer for a one-hour summer special. Woo is a regular chef guest on The Rachael Ray Show and Hallmark Channel's The Home and Family Show,.

Woo was a featured guest on Food Network's The Kitchen, Hollywood Today Live, and featured guest judge on the Thanksgiving episode of Food Network's Beat Bobby Flay in 2017. In the second half of the year, he was hired as the LA correspondent for the Scripps Network Interactive Digital platform, Genius Kitchen. In 2018, he made a second guest appearance on Food Network's The Kitchen, along with multiple judging appearances on episodes of Food Network's Beat Bobby Flay. Ronnie has made several appearances on CMT's talk show, Pickler & Ben and even co-hosted a special cooking/dating episode called "Cooking For Love With Chef Ronnie Woo" for Pickler & Ben in 2019.  In the Fall of 2019, Woo was a guest on The Kelly Clarkson Show.

Woo continues to make regular guest appearances on The Today Show, The Rachael Ray Show, and The Home and Family Show.

In the beginning of 2022, Woo made a special appearance on the Kevin Hart Winter Olympics Tailgate Party special that aired exclusively on Peacock (streaming service). Woo is also a celebrity judge on the Netflix show Is It Cake?.

YouTube channel and Food Network Kitchen

At the end of 2019, Woo announced the launch of his YouTube channel, which would premiere its first mini-series, Craving Jetlag, in January 2020. In 2020, Woo signed as on-camera talent with the Food Network Kitchen app, where he delivers live cooking classes and on-demand cooking videos.

Cookbook 

In August 2020, Woo inked a significant publishing deal with Houghton Mifflin Harcourt for his debut cookbook titled Did You Eat Yet?  set for release in the Spring of 2023.

Personal life 
Woo is openly gay.

References

External links 
 Official site
 Food To Get You Laid

American television chefs
American male chefs
1985 births
Living people
Chefs from Seattle
Male models from Washington (state)
University of Washington alumni
University of California, Los Angeles alumni
LGBT people from Washington (state)
Gay men